NY Gov. may refer to:
 Government of New York (state)
 Governor of New York